Norken is an Ortsgemeinde – a community belonging to a Verbandsgemeinde – in the Westerwaldkreis in Rhineland-Palatinate, Germany.

Geography

The community lies in the Westerwald between Limburg and Siegen on the boundary with North Rhine-Westphalia. The community is also between the Große Nister and Kleine Nister. Norken belongs to the Verbandsgemeinde of Bad Marienberg, a kind of collective municipality. Its seat is in the like-named town.

History
In 1262, Norken had its first documentary mention.

Politics

The municipal council is made up of 16 council members who were elected in a majority vote in a municipal election on 13 June 2004.

Regular events
At Easter, the traditional Eierschibbeln – a kind of Easter egg roll – is celebrated.

Economy and infrastructure

Running right near the community is Bundesstraße 414, leading from Herborn to Altenkirchen. The nearest Autobahn interchanges are in Siegen and Wilnsdorf on the A 45 (Dortmund–Hanau), some 26 km away. The nearest InterCityExpress stop is the railway station at Montabaur on the Cologne-Frankfurt high-speed rail line.

References

External links
 Norken 
  Norken in the collective municipality’s Web pages 

Municipalities in Rhineland-Palatinate
Westerwaldkreis